The Pemba white-eye (Zosterops vaughani) is a species of bird in the family Zosteropidae. It is endemic to Tanzania.

Its natural habitats are subtropical or tropical dry forests, subtropical or tropical moist lowland forests, subtropical or tropical mangrove forests, and dry savanna.

History
The Pemba white-eye derives its scientific name, Zosterops vaughani, from John Henry Vaughan, after whom it was named.

References

Zosterops
Endemic birds of Tanzania
Pemba Island
Birds described in 1924
Taxa named by David Armitage Bannerman
Taxonomy articles created by Polbot
Northern Zanzibar–Inhambane coastal forest mosaic